Parkmore distillery was a producer of single malt Scotch whisky that operated between 1894 and 1988.

History
Parkmore was founded in 1894 by the Parkmore Distillery Co., but ownership was transferred to James Watson and Co. Ltd. in 1900. This company was then acquired by John Dewar & Sons Ltd. in 1923. In 1925, ownership was transferred again to Distillers Company Ltd. DCL transferred it to Scottish Malt Distilleries Ltd. in 1930, and stopped production in 1931.

References

1894 establishments in Scotland
1931 disestablishments in Scotland
Scottish malt whisky
Distilleries in Scotland
British companies established in 1894
British companies disestablished in 1931